Neil David Garrett (born 20 September 1975) is a British television producer and director.

Garrett began his career in television in 1999, and became a producer for ITV News in 2003. In August 2005 he secured the leak into the investigation of the death of Jean Charles de Menezes. His dossier revealed crucial facts of the case, and police forensic photographs which proved that De Menezes was not acting or dressed suspiciously - it had been a catalogue of failings which led to his death.

This scoop earned ITV News nominations for awards from the British Academy of Film and Television Arts and the Royal Television Society.

Six weeks after ITV news ran the story, Garrett was arrested during a raid on his home by the Leicestershire Police Serious Crime Unit, who had been commissioned by the Independent Police Complaints Commission to investigate the leak.

After being imprisoned, having his personal computer and telecoms equipment seized, and posting bail on four separate occasions in total, Garrett was eventually cleared of any wrongdoing on 4 May 2006.

He wrote an account of his ordeal in a special report for The Guardian newspaper on 15 May 2006.

References

British television producers
1975 births
Living people